The Grow is a 2012 Chinese animated adventure comedy film directed by Ha Lei. It was released in China on December 29, 2012. The film was followed by The Grow 2 (2015).

Voice cast
Han Xue
Wu Tian Hao 
Yu Li
Rong Rong
Tong Zirong 
Zhou Yemang

Reception
The film earned  at the Chinese box office.

References

2010s adventure comedy films
2012 animated films
2012 films
Animated adventure films
Animated comedy films
Chinese animated films
2012 comedy films
2010s Mandarin-language films